Matthew James Koalska (born May 16, 1980) is an American former professional ice hockey center. He was drafted in the fifth round, 154th overall, by the Nashville Predators in the 2000 NHL Entry Draft. He played 3 games in the National Hockey League with the New York Islanders during the 2005–06 season. He retired in 2007 due to heart issues.

Playing career
Koalska played his college hockey at the University of Minnesota from 2000–2004 winning two National Championships.

Koalska made his professional debut with the Bridgeport Sound Tigers of the American Hockey League in the 2004–05 season.  He appeared in three NHL games with the New York Islanders in the 2005–06 season, going scoreless. On January 5, 2007, the Islanders traded Koalska to the Ottawa Senators in exchange for defenceman Tomas Malec.  Koalska finished the season with the Senators' AHL affiliate, the Binghamton Senators before signing in the off-season with HC Bolazno in the Italian Elite League. However, Koalska did not play with Bolazno, having to retire due to a heart condition. He returned to University of Minnesota to complete his degree.

Career statistics

Regular season and playoffs

References

External links
 

1980 births
Living people
American men's ice hockey centers
Binghamton Senators players
Bridgeport Sound Tigers players
Hershey Bears players
Ice hockey people from Saint Paul, Minnesota
Minnesota Golden Gophers men's ice hockey players
Nashville Predators draft picks
New York Islanders players
Twin City Vulcans players
NCAA men's ice hockey national champions